Sri Venkateswara Veterinary College also known as College of Veterinary Sciences, Proddatur is established in 2008 in Proddatur by Y. S. RajaSekhara Reddy, in the Indian state of Andhra Pradesh.

Overview
The Government of Andhra Pradesh established a new Veterinary College at Proddatur, Kadapa district. The college started functioning from the premises of Proddutur Co-Operative Milk Producers Union, Proddutur from the academic year 2008–09 with an admittance of 31 students into the first year B.V.Sc & A.H course. The Veterinary Council of India, New Delhi has granted recognition to the College and the number of seats in BVSc & AH has been increased to 60 from 30 from the Academic year 2014–15.

References

Veterinary schools in India
Universities and colleges in Kadapa district
Educational institutions established in 2008
2008 establishments in Andhra Pradesh